Baldwin Hills Scenic Overlook is a  California State Park is located just southwest of downtown Culver City. To some Los Angeles area residents, the site is more commonly known as the Culver City Stairs. This outdoor staircase is designed into the trails leading up to a view of the greater Los Angeles area. 

The park is being restored as a habitat with native California plants and is “home to a variety of snakes, small mammals, and birds.”

In addition to the stairs, there is a switchback trail that crosses the stair landings at several points. The paved road (for car drivers and bicyclists) up the visitor center parking lot has a parallel pedestrian stair case for most of the route.

The scenic overlook park is part of the larger Park to Playa Trail that connects the Baldwin Hills parklands to the beach.

History
The land was “once the location of an oil field, with a drinking water reservoir at the top.” The state of California purchased the property in 2000, then closed it to the public in the middle of 2006 to construct the trails (which include the staircase) and visitor center. The visitor center was created by the San Diego-based Safdie Rabines Architects, whose goal in designing the overlook was to “encompass non-traditional park demographics and environments.” The duo's work has graced Southern California educational and civic projects like UC San Diego’s Eleanor Roosevelt College, the student center at UCLA, and the Otay Mesa Library. The park reopened in April 2009 with the 282 unique, irregular steps made from recycled concrete found on the park.

Details

In the center of the landing between the 247th and 248th steps is a bronze marker stating the elevation, surrounded by two semi-circular engravings:

Races
Beginning in 2014, Aztlan Athletics has held annual races up the stairs.  The current record from this officially timed race was set in 2015 by Leony Mendez at 2:09.

Kelvin Martinez of Los Angeles, Ca. since 2018 has consistently been the leading presence at the staircase going up and down without stopping 10 to 13 times under 1:10:00 time frame.

Gallery

See also
 Santa Monica Stairs
 Stair climbing
 Tower running
 Park to Playa Trail

References

External links
 Baldwin Hills Scenic Overlook Brochure (PDF)
 Baldwin Hills Scenic Overlook, California Department of Parks and Recreation
 https://scenicoverlook.wordpress.com/our-story/

Buildings and structures in Culver City, California
Stairways in the United States
Parks in Los Angeles County, California
Baldwin Hills (mountain range)